Steinburg is a district of Schleswig-Holstein, Germany.

Steinburg may also refer to:

Steinburg, Stormarn, a municipality in the district of Stormarn, Schleswig-Holstein, Germany
Steinburg, Saxony-Anhalt, a municipality in the district Burgenlandkreis, Saxony-Anhalt, Germany
Bob Steinburg (born 1948), American politician

See also
Steinberg (disambiguation)